Gulde is an unincorporated community in Rankin County, Mississippi, United States.

Gulde was established as a flag station on the Alabama and Vicksburg Railway in 1858, and is said to be named for a railroad official.

The Gulde Church is located south of the settlement, and the Gulde Cemetery is north.

References

Unincorporated communities in Rankin County, Mississippi
Unincorporated communities in Mississippi